Rishav Raj (born 3 February 1996) is an Indian cricketer. He made his List A debut on 24 February 2021, for Bihar in the 2020–21 Vijay Hazare Trophy.

References

External links
 

1996 births
Living people
Indian cricketers
Bihar cricketers
Place of birth missing (living people)